= Wood industry in Slovenia =

The wood industry in Slovenia contributes 1.7% to the country's GDP and is an important economic sector.

Slovenia has over 1.2 million hectares of forest, with over 75% of these being privately owned. According to the Slovenian Forestry Institute and the Statistical Office of the Republic of Slovenia, 4.3 million cubic meters of forest were harvested in 2023. Slovenia is the third-most forested country in the European Union after Finland and Sweden.

In 2015, the Wood Industry Directorate was established to and promote competitiveness in the wood industry in order to promote its growth.
